Korea Foreign School (KFS) is a non-profit private coeducational day-school in the Gangnam Area of Seoul, South Korea. KFS is established and operated under the Seoul Metropolitan Office of Education. Korea Foreign School educates children from grade 1 through grade 10.

Accreditation and memberships
KFS is accredited by the Council of International Schools (CIS) and the Western Association of Schools and Colleges (WASC). The school is an affiliated member of the National Association of Independent Schools (NAIS), the East Asia Regional Council of Overseas Schools (EARCOS), and the Korea Council of Overseas Schools (KORCOS).

Curriculum
KFS is currently an IB World School of IB Primary Years Programme (PYP) and Middle Years Programme (MYP). Using the IB curriculum framework, KFS provides an international education for students in grades 1-10.
The PYP focuses on the development of the whole child as an inquirer, both in the classroom and in the world outside. It is defined by six transdisciplinary themes of global significance, explored using knowledge and skills derived from six subject areas, with a powerful emphasis on inquiry-based learning.
Subjects Offered:
Primary Years Programme (PYP)
1. Reading & Writing
2. Mathematics
3. Science
4. Social Studies
5. Arts 
6. Languages – Korean
7. Life Skills
8. Physical, Social and Personal Education

The Middle Years Programme grades 6-10 includes the following 8 curricular areas:
Group #1: Language and Literature (English) based on Readers’ and Writers` Workshop model (Teacher’s College, Columbia University)
Group #2: Acquired Language (English, Spanish and Korean)
Group #3: Humanities (Individuals & Societies, History, Economics, Politics etc.)
Group #4: Integrated Science (Earth Science, Biology, Chemistry, Physics)
Group #5: Mathematics based on Singapore Math program
Group #6: Art, Drama, Film
Group #7: Design Technology
Group #8: Physical and Health Education
KFS adopted the Common Core State Standards (CCSS), the Next Generation Science Standards (NGSS), and the National Standards for Social Studies.

After school activities
Korea Foreign School offers a wide variety of after school activities including:

 Basketball
 Clay dough
 Coding
 Drama
 Golf
 Group games
 Gymnastics
 Handcraft
 Hapkido
 LEGO
 Newspaper/news and video production
 Robotics
 Soccer
 Spanish
 Mandarin
 Table tennis

References 

Korea Foreign School (KFS). [www.koreaforeign.org School Official Website]. Retrieved 28 June 2017.
KFS Quick Overview. Retrieved 28 June 2017.
Seoul Metropolitan Office of Education. .
TeacherHorizons. . 
Naver Map. .
Angloinfo.
.

Schools in South Korea
Educational institutions established in 2007
International schools in Seoul
2007 establishments in South Korea
Seocho District